Robert James Ellis (10 May 1942 – 3 April 2016) was an Australian writer, journalist, filmmaker, and political commentator. He was a student at the University of Sydney at the same time as other notable Australians including Clive James, Germaine Greer, Les Murray, John Bell, Ken Horler, Robert Hughes and Mungo McCallum. He lived in Sydney with the author and screenwriter Anne Brooksbank; they had three children.

Early years
Ellis was raised a Seventh-day Adventist. He says the "seminal moment" of his life happened when he was ten and his 22-year-old sister was killed while crossing the road. He attended Lismore High and then the University of Sydney on a Sir Robert Menzies scholarship. After graduating he had a variety of jobs before being employed by the Australian Broadcasting Corporation.

Writing career
Ellis was a regular contributor to the Nation Review in the 1970s and subsequently contributed to Fairfax Media newspapers and The National Times.

Ellis became a popular playwright, usually working in collaboration. In 1970 he and Michael Boddy (1934–2014) co-wrote 'The Legend of King O'Malley, a musical play based on the life of King O'Malley. From 1975 to 1986 he and Brooksbank also owned the Stables Theatre in Kings Cross, Sydney, during which time it became home to the Griffin Theatre Company.
They sold it in 1986 for $200,000.

Ellis wrote several film scripts, often in collaboration with others, notably Newsfront (1978), ...Maybe This Time (1980, with Anne Brooksbank), Fatty Finn (1980) Man of Flowers (1983, with Paul Cox), Goodbye Paradise (1983), Where the Green Ants Dream (Wo die grünen Ameisen träumen) (1984, with Werner Herzog), My First Wife (1984, with Paul Cox), Cactus (1986, with Paul Cox) and The Nostradamus Kid (1992).

In 1980 Ellis signed a contract with the New South Wales Film Corporation to write ten feature film scripts over two years for $7,000 for each script, with a payment of $12,000 for the second draft if they wanted to make the movie. Ellis says he presented them with 33 ideas, they chose five and he chose five.

Ellis also directed several films, including The Nostradamus Kid (1992), Warm Nights on a Slow Moving Train (1988), Unfinished Business (1985) and Run Rabbit, Run (2007).Kerr C The Curse of Bob Ellis (review) at Crikey.com.au, 27 August 2007

Ellis's writing for television included the miniseries True Believers (with co-author Matt Carroll) and Infamous Victory: Ben Chifley's Battle for Coal (2008), with co-author Geoff Burton, made for Film Australia.

Awards
Ellis won the Australian Film Institute Award for Best Screenplay for Newsfront (1978, with Anne Brooksbank and Phillip Noyce) and for My First Wife (1984, with Paul Cox).

 Politics 
Ellis, a supporter of the Australian Labor Party, wrote speeches for a number of Labor leaders (such as Bob Carr, Paul Keating and Kim Beazley) and wrote extensively on Labor history.

Regarding Ellis's speech writing, Beazley said on the 7.30 Report that if he had used any of Ellis's speeches he would have been out of politics.

Ellis unsuccessfully contested the Federal seat of Mackellar as an independent candidate against the Liberal Party's Bronwyn Bishop in a by-election in 1994 as the ALP did not field a candidate in that by-election.

Ellis's 2011 book Suddenly, Last Winter – An Election Diary created headlines for its criticism of the Labor Prime Minister, Julia Gillard, and praise for the Liberal Opposition Leader, Tony Abbott. He described Gillard as "not well informed" and "sudden, firm and wrong" in everything she does. He also said "She has no power, no influence, no friends, no learning. There's not much there", whilst describing Abbott as having "good manners", being "formidable" and possessing a "first-class mind".

Ellis wrote speeches for South Australian Premier Mike Rann for a number of years.

Death
On 18 July 2015, Ellis reported on his blog that he would be attending hospital for what he called "ominous" tests on his liver. The next day he announced "The news is very bad", and that the tests had revealed he had advanced liver cancer with a prognosis that he had months, if not weeks, to live.

Ellis died on 3 April 2016, at his home in Sydney's Northern Beaches.

 Controversy 
In June 2018, Kate and Rozanna Lilley, daughters of celebrated playwright Dorothy Hewett, alleged that they had engaged in sex at the ages of 16 and 15 with Ellis and others on several different occasions, with their mother's approval.Playwright Dorothy Hewett’s daughters say their mother’s men used them for sex, The Australian, June 9, 2018

 Writings 
Ellis wrote two books, Goodbye Jerusalem and Goodbye Babylon, on his experiences of the Labor Party. The first edition of Goodbye Jerusalem was pulped following a successful defamation case brought by two Liberal cabinet ministers, Tony Abbott and Peter Costello, and their wives. At issue was the single sentence where Ellis quoted politician Rodney Cavalier as having said, "Abbott and Costello...they're both in the Right wing of the Labour [sic] Party till the one woman fucked both of them and married one of them and inducted them into the Young Liberals". The publisher, Random House, accepted that the disputed content was a falsehood and the book was removed from sale. ACT Supreme Court Justice Higgins awarded the two politicians and their wives a total of $277,000 damages. A new edition of the book was published three months later which omitted the defamatory passage.  

In 1998 Penguin Books Australia published Ellis's First Abolish the Customer – 202 Arguments Against Economic Rationalism, then Ellis's The Capitalism Delusion – How Global Economics Wrecked Everything and What To Do About It in 2009, One Hundred Days of Summer in 2010, and The Ellis Laws in 2014.

PlaysThe Legend of King O'Malley (1970) with Michael BoddyBig Brother Dragon (1971) with Michael BoddyDuke of Edinburgh Assassinated or The Vindication of Henry Parkes (1971) with Dick HallThe Francis James Dossier (1973) – later The James Dossier (1975) – musical about Francis JamesWhitlam Days (1975)Down Under (1976) with Anne BrooksbankA Very Good Year (1980)Man, the musical (1990s) book and lyrics with Denny Lawrence, music by Chris NealA Local Man: A Play about Ben Chifley (2004) with Robin McLachlanShakespeare in Italy (2012) with Denny LawrenceIntimate Strangers (unproduced) with Denny Lawrence

ScreenplaysNewsfront (1978) with Anne BrooksbankFatty Finn (1980)Maybe This Time (1980) with Anne BrooksbankGoodbye Paradise (1983) with Denny LawrenceMan of Flowers (1983) with Paul CoxThe Winds of Jarrah (1983)My First Wife (1984) with Paul CoxUnfinished Business (1985) – also directedTop Kid (1985) (TV) with John HepworthThe Paper Boy (1985) (TV) with John HepworthCactus (1986) with Paul CoxThe Gillies Republic (1986) (TV)Bullseye (1987)Perhaps Love (1987) (TV)True Believers (1988) (TV)Warm Nights on a Slow Moving Train (1988) – also directedGillies and Company (1992) (TV)Dreaming of Lords (1993) with Ernie Dingo – also directedThe Nostradamus Kid (1993) – also directedEbbtide (1994)Wildside (1998) Episode 24Bastards from the Bush, A Journey with Bob Ellis and Les Murray (1998) – documentaryInfamous Victory: Ben Chifley's Battle for Coal (2008) – documentary

Unmade screenplaysThe Road to Gundagai (1980) – vehicle for Bert Newton and Gerard Kennedy as soldiers on latrine duty during the bombing of Darwin
comedy script about radio actors in the 1940s (circa 1980)
adaptation of The Sentimental Bloke for director Maurice Murphy starring Phillip Quast
mini-series with James Ricketson about Bea Miles (circa 1980)
road film about two girls going north to audition for a cabaret version of Brigadoon in Surfers Paradise (circa 1980)These Remembrances set around the time of the Whitlam Dismissal (circa 1980)The Girl from Kiev about two 40-year-old divorced lawyers travelling near Chernobyl falling for a Russian girlShakespeare in Italy (2011)Paper Tigers – mini series about the Murdoch family

NovelsMad Dog Morgan (1976) with Anne Brooksbank – based on the Philippe Mora film Mad Dog MorganFatty Finn (1980) – based on his film scriptTop Kid (1985) – novelisation with John Hepworth of his film scriptThe Paper Boy (1985) - novelisation with John Hepworth of his film scriptThe Hewson Tapes : A Secret History, Perhaps, of Our Times (1993) – fiction presented as the diary of John HewsonThe Season (1996) – with Roy Masters

Non-fictionThe Things We Did Last Summer: An Election Journal – account of the 1983 Australian federal electionTwo weeks in another country : a journal of the 1983 British election – account of the 1983 United Kingdom general electionLetters to the Future (1987) – collection of writings from 1969–87The Inessential Ellis (1992) – collection of writingsGoodbye Jerusalem : night thoughts of a Labor outsider (1997) – writings centred on the history of the Australian Labor Party up to the 1996 Australian federal electionFirst abolish the customer: 202 arguments against economic rationalism (1998)So it goes : essays, broadcasts, speeches 1987–1999 (1999)Goodbye Babylon : further journeys in time and politics (2002)Night thoughts in time of war (2004)And so it went: night thoughts in a year of change (2009) – events around the 2007 Australian federal electionThe capitalism delusion : how global economics wrecked everything and what to do about it (2009)One hundred days of summer : how we got to where we are (2010)Suddenly, last winter : an election diary (2010) – diary of the 2010 Australian federal electionThe Ellis Laws (2014)

ActingI Own the Racecourse (1985) – filmThe Human Behan (1995–96) – playWaiting for Godot (2000) – playMan of Flowers (Paul Cox, 1983) - film

References

Further reading
 
 
 
 Leser, David "The two of us: Bob Ellis & Anne Brooksbank" The Sydney Morning Herald (Good Weekend) 16 August 1997 p. 12
 Arts news "Arts community to help Bob Ellis, after recent house fire" The Sydney Morning Herald 24 April 1993 p. 46
 King, Noel "Abbott and Costello. View From The Couch" The Sydney Morning Herald'' (Good Weekend) 21 November 1998 p. 94

External links
Interview with Bob Ellis
Ellis Table Talk (blog)

Bob Ellis's Australian theatre credits at AusStage
Bob Ellis Essays on the ABC website Unleashed
1988 interview with Bob Ellis at SBS Movie Show
Table Talk: Bob Ellis on Film and Theatre blog
Bob Ellis at Australian Screen Online

1942 births
2016 deaths
Australian freelance journalists
Australian media personalities
Australian film directors
Writers from New South Wales
Australian screenwriters
University of Sydney alumni
Deaths from liver cancer
Deaths from cancer in New South Wales